Klara Thormalm (born 29 March 1998) is a Swedish swimmer. She competed in the women's 100 metre breaststroke event at the 2020 European Aquatics Championships, in Budapest, Hungary.

References

External links
 

1998 births
Living people
Swedish female breaststroke swimmers
Place of birth missing (living people)
Medalists at the FINA World Swimming Championships (25 m)
21st-century Swedish women